Rolf Nehn (born 21 February 1959) is a Brazilian sailor. He competed in the 470 event at the 1984 Summer Olympics.

References

External links
 

1959 births
Living people
Brazilian male sailors (sport)
Olympic sailors of Brazil
Sailors at the 1984 Summer Olympics – 470
Sportspeople from Porto Alegre